is a Japanese mobile game by GREE. The plot features anthropomorphized dragons as characters. It is a freemium game, as the base game is free of charge but game add-ons can be downloaded for various prices. The game was announced in October 2012 and users who preregistered got a rare card.

An anime adaptation by Gonzo aired in Japan from April  to July 2013.

Characters

Leviathan is a water mage from the land of Aquafall who makes friends with Bahamut and Jörmungandr while searching for her older brother. She lives in a humble cottage by herself and can transform into a water-affinity dragon girl.

Bahamut is a fire mage and daughter of the city's leader. She lives in a huge mansion, along with her father and personal maids. She can transform into a fire-affinity dragon girl.

Jörmungandr doesn't have any elemental magic abilities, but is by far the physically strongest girl of the trio, capable of lifting huge boulders by herself - likely through strength boosting magic and can transform into an earth-affinity dragon girl brandishing a huge axe. She was adopted along with her 3 younger sisters by a team of miners and they call each one of them their fathers.

Syrup is a fairy who befriends the girls and usually tries to recruit them into the "Aquafall Defense Squad", that she intends to establish to fight back the Toripu. Despite being small, she has quite an appetite, capable of eating several times her own weight in one meal and is very honest, to the point of bluntness that usually gets her into trouble.

Yurlungur is a large dragon who appears in episode 3, and uses Syrup to translate what he is saying to the girls. He tells them he isn't feeling well. They help him by going inside of his body and defeating a giant Toripu that was making him feel ill. He then thanks the girls and tells them that they can call him anytime they are in trouble.

Media

Anime
An anime series directed by Kenichi Yatani and produced by Gonzo, GREE, and Dentsu aired from April 6 to July 7, 2013. The series uses two pieces of theme music. The series was licensed for home video and digital distribution by Sentai Filmworks, while Crunchyroll streamed the series under the title Zettai Boei Leviatan. After Sentai Filmworks lost the rights to the series, it was re-licensed by Funimation.

Episode list

Reception
Carl Kimlinger of Anime News Network gave the series an overall C+ rating. He gave credit to both director Kenichi Yatani and the character designs of Takaharu Okuma for crafting a light-hearted adventure with an "intensely cute" female cast that delivers a "pleasing dry sense of humor" but found it throwaway with its ongoing story using "musty RPG plotting" and its overall charm being a detriment to itself, saying "That frothiness is both Leviathans great strength and its ultimate weakness. It's effortlessly fun to watch, but also about as memorable as, well, something that I can't quite remember right now." Stig Høgset, writing for THEM Anime Reviews, heavily criticized the series for being a poor adaptation of a fantasy RPG game that puts an overreliance on moe designs and fanservice, while the overall plot and characters get little development to engage viewers, concluding that its "A failure in every single aspect of what makes a show good, and I've seen a lot of relatively average fantasy anime that at least managed to be entertaining."

References

External links
Official game website 
Official anime website 

2013 video games
Anime television series based on video games
Android (operating system) games
Digital collectible card games
Fantasy anime and manga
Freeware games
Funimation
Gonzo (company)
IOS games
Japan-exclusive video games
Role-playing video games
Sentai Filmworks
TV Tokyo original programming
Video games developed in Japan